The Harrison Park Golf Course and Clubhouse at Harrison Park, is located in Danville, Illinois.

The course is located on  near the North Fork of the Vermilion River.

It has 100% weather protection all year round

References

External links

Gallery of photos of Harrison Park by smugmug user Cessna

Golf clubs and courses in Illinois
Buildings and structures in Danville, Illinois
Sports in Danville, Illinois
1928 establishments in Illinois